Suhle is a river of Lower Saxony, Germany.

It is a left tributary of the Hahle in Gieboldehausen.

See also
List of rivers of Lower Saxony

References

Rivers of Lower Saxony
Rivers of Germany